Mirzalıbəyli (also, Mirzalybeyli) is a village and municipality in the Barda Rayon of Azerbaijan.  It has a population of 808.

References 

Populated places in Barda District